Dr. Zikrul Haque (1 September 1914 — 12 April 1971) was a physician and politician who was elected to the National Assembly of Pakistan in 1970. He was killed in the Bangladesh Liberation war and is considered a Martyr in Bangladesh.

Early life
Haque was born in Saidpur, Bangladesh on September 1, 1914. He graduated from Saidpur Pilot High School in 1933 and completed his Licentiate in Medicine and Surgery from Campbell Medical School in Kolkata on 1939.

Career
Haque worked in the Hazarihat Charitable Dispensary under Darwary Hospital in Syedpur as the Medical officer. After which he was the medical officer in Shah Abdul Gafur Charitable Dispensary in Dangargat. Then he worked at Zearatullah Medical Hall. He joined the All India Muslim Students Federation and later the Muslim League after the partition of India. He was elected as an independent to the Legislative Assembly in 1954. In 1958 he was elected chairman of Syedpur Municipality. He was elected to the National Assembly in 1970 as an Awami League candidate. He supported the Non-cooperation movement in 1971.

Death and legacy
On 25 March 1971, at the onset of Operation Searchlight and Bangladesh Liberation war, he was detained by Pakistan Army from his residence. He was kept in Rangpur Cantonment, where he was tortured. He was executed with other detainees on 12 April 1971. Bangladesh Post Office issued commemorative postal stamp on 14 December 1996. He was posthumously awarded the Independence Award in 2001 by the Government of Bangladesh.

References

1914 births
1971 deaths
People killed in the Bangladesh Liberation War
People from Nilphamari District
20th-century Pakistani physicians